The 1987 All-Ireland Minor Hurling Championship was the 57th staging of the All-Ireland Minor Hurling Championship since its establishment by the Gaelic Athletic Association in 1928.

Offaly entered the championship as the defending champions.

On 6 September 1987, Offaly won the championship following a 2-8 to 0-12 defeat of Tipperary in the All-Ireland final. This was their second All-Ireland title overall and their second title in-a-row.

Offaly's Declan Pilkington was the championship's top scorer with 2-28.

Results

Leinster Minor Hurling Championship

Quarter-final

Semi-finals

Final

Munster Minor Hurling Championship

First round

Semi-finals

Final

All-Ireland Minor Hurling Championship

Semi-finals

Final

Championship statistics

Top scorers

Top scorers overall

Miscellaneous

 The final of the Leinster Championship was delayed for several weeks as a result of damage to the Croke Park pitch during a U2 concert.
 Offaly retained the Leinster Championship title for the first and only time in their history.

References

External links
 All-Ireland Minor Hurling Championship: Roll Of Honour

Minor
All-Ireland Minor Hurling Championship